Russell Bodine (born June 30, 1992) is an American football center who is a free agent. He was drafted by the Cincinnati Bengals in the fourth round of the 2014 NFL Draft. He played college football at North Carolina.

High school career 
A native of Scottsville, Virginia, Bodine attended Fork Union Military Academy, where he was named first-team all-state at the highest of three private school divisions for two straight seasons. He was teammates with Morgan Moses, Austin Pasztor, Terrance West, and Carlos Hyde.

Regarded as a three-star recruit by Rivals.com, Bodine was listed as the No. 8 center prospect in his class.

College career 
As a sophomore, Bodine started all 12 games at center, having eventual NFL players Travis Bond and Jonathan Cooper lined up on each side of him.

As a junior, he primarily played center again, but also was moved along the offensive line. On December 30, 2013, he announced his decision to forgo his final year of eligibility and enter the 2014 NFL Draft.

Professional career 
Bodine registered 42 repetitions in the  bench press, for best in his class.

Cincinnati Bengals
The Cincinnati Bengals selected Bodine in the fourth round (111th overall) of the 2014 NFL Draft. He was the fifth center and 13th interior offensive linemen selected in 2014.

On May 23, 2014, the Cincinnati Bengals signed Bodine to a four-year, $2.67 million contract that includes a signing bonus of $456,456.

Throughout training camp, Bodine competed against Trevor Robinson for the job as the starting center after it was left vacant after the departure of Kyle Cook. He received first-team reps at center from the beginning of training camp and was officially named the starter by head coach Marvin Lewis to start the regular season. He made his first career start and made his professional regular season debut in the Cincinnati Bengals' season-opening 23–16 victory over the Baltimore Ravens. He started all 16 regular season games as the Cincinnati Bengals went 10-5-1 and made the AFC playoffs.

In his first four years in Cincinnati, Bodine started all 16 games at center in each season for the Bengals.

Buffalo Bills
On March 19, 2018, Bodine signed a two-year contract with the Buffalo Bills. He was named the backup center to start the 2018 season behind Ryan Groy. He took over the starting role in Week 3 following struggles from Groy. He started the next 10 games before suffering a broken fibula in Week 13. He was placed on injured reserve on December 4, 2018.

New England Patriots
On August 30, 2019, Bodine was traded to the New England Patriots for a sixth-round pick. He was released on September 6, 2019.

Detroit Lions
On December 31, 2019, Bodine signed a reserve/future contract with the Detroit Lions. On August 5, 2020, he announced he would opt out of the 2020 season due to the COVID-19 pandemic. He was released after the season on March 8, 2021.

References

External links 
 
 North Carolina Tar Heels bio

1992 births
Living people
American football offensive linemen
New England Patriots players
Buffalo Bills players
Cincinnati Bengals players
Detroit Lions players
North Carolina Tar Heels football players
People from Scottsville, Virginia
Players of American football from Virginia